Houston Methodist Episcopal Church, South is a historic church on Arkansas Highway 60, near its junction with Arkansas Highway 216 in Houston, Arkansas.  It is a single-story wood-frame structure, with a gabled roof, weatherboard siding, and a foundation of brick and concrete.  A hip-roof vestibule projects from the front, with a single-stage square tower above, topped by a pyramidal roof.  Doors and windows are set in rounded-arch openings.  Built in 1912 for a congregation organized in 1893; it was its second building, it having outgrown the first.  It is a fine local example of ecclesiastical Colonial Revival architecture.

The building was listed on the National Register of Historic Places in 1994.

See also
National Register of Historic Places listings in Perry County, Arkansas

References

Methodist churches in Arkansas
Churches on the National Register of Historic Places in Arkansas
Colonial Revival architecture in Arkansas
Churches completed in 1912
Churches in Perry County, Arkansas
1912 establishments in Arkansas
National Register of Historic Places in Perry County, Arkansas